Lammermoor or Lammermuir may refer to:
 The Lammermuir or Lammermoor Hills in southern Scotland
 The Lammermoor Range of hills in southern New Zealand, named after the Scottish hills
 Lammermoor, Queensland, a locality in Central Queensland, Australia
 The Bride of Lammermoor, a novel by Sir Walter Scott
 Lucia di Lammermoor, an opera by Gaetano Donizetti based on Scott's book